Yutaka Tamaki (Japanese 玉置 隆; born 11 September 1986) is a Japanese professional baseball pitcher who currently plays for the Hanshin Tigers of Nippon Professional Baseball.

References

1986 births
Living people
Baseball people from Wakayama Prefecture
Japanese expatriate baseball players in the United States
Nippon Professional Baseball pitchers
Hanshin Tigers players
Waikiki Beach Boys players